Sympiezomias is a genus of beetles belonging to the family Curculionidae. Species are distributed throughout India, Sri Lanka, Myanmar, Malaysia, Thailand, China and Japan. Almost all species are very uniform in external structures which leads to misidentification.

Description
Eyes lateral, broadly oval and moderately prominent. Rostrum longer than the head. In antennae, scape hardly exceeding the middle of the eye. Scape cylindrical, with slender base. Prothorax truncate at base and apex. Scutellum small. Elytra ovate, and narrowly marginate at the base. True shoulders are absent in elytra. Sternum with the narrow mesosternal epimera. Episterna narrow. Venter with rounded or subtruncate intercoxal process. In legs, femora clavate and front tibiae longer than the others.

Species
 Sympiezomias acutipennis (Boheman, 1845)
 Sympiezomias anamalainus Marshall, 1916
 Sympiezomias basalis Aurivillius, 1892
 Sympiezomias boesoni Marshall, 1921
 Sympiezomias chenggongensis Chao, 1977
 Sympiezomias cicatricollis Voss, 1932
 Sympiezomias citri Chao, 1977 
 Sympiezomias clams Chao, 1977
 Sympiezomias cretaceus Faust, 1897
 Sympiezomias cribricollis Kono, 1930
 Sympiezomias cupreovirens Marshall, 1918
 Sympiezomias decipiens Marshall, 1916
 Sympiezomias elongatus Chao, 1977
 Sympiezomias frater Marshall, 1916
 Sympiezomias gemmius Zhang, 1992
 Sympiezomias guangxiensis Chao, 1977 
 Sympiezomias herzi Faust, 1887
 Sympiezomias hispidus Marshall, 1916
 Sympiezomias inflatus Faust, 1895
 Sympiezomias kraatzi Heller, 1901
 Sympiezomias lewisi (Roelofs, 1879)
 Sympiezomias lividus Marshall, 1916
 Sympiezomias menglongensis Chao, 1977
 Sympiezomias menzhehensis Chao, 1977
 Sympiezomias peroteti (Boheman, 1845)
 Sympiezomias praeteritus Marshall, 1916
 Sympiezomias serratipes Marshall, 1916
 Sympiezomias setosus Aurivillius, 1892
 Sympiezomias shanensis Marshall, 1941
 Sympiezomias shanghaiensis Chao, 1977
 Sympiezomias subserratipes Ramamurthy, 2010
 Sympiezomias subvirens Marshall, 1941
 Sympiezomias sulcicollis Faust, 1895
 Sympiezomias sulphuratus Marshall, 1916
 Sympiezomias unicolor Chao, 1977
 Sympiezomias variabilis Voss, 1932
 Sympiezomias velatus  (Chevrolat, 1845)

References

Curculionidae
Curculionidae genera